Gremuchiy  is an urban-type settlement as part of the Krasnogorievsk rural locality in the Boguchansky District of Russia. It is located in the north-eastern part of the Krasnoyarsk Krai. It got its name from the Gremuchiy brook (it can be translated as Rattle brook).

Geography 

The settlement is situated on the right shore of the Angara River opposite to Boguchany  (the administrative center of the Boguchansky District of the Krasnoyarsk Krai, Russia).

Neighboring areas:
 east: the Krasnogorievsk rural locality (the administrative center)
 south: Boguchany

Demographics 
2010 year - 1881

Economy 
The main occupation of the locals - wood export and timber rafting.

Infrastructure

References 

Cities and towns in Krasnoyarsk Krai